Jason Butcher (born October 23, 1984) is an American mixed martial artist currently competing in the Light Heavyweight division of the Professional Fighters League. A professional competitor since 2008, he has also competed for Bellator and King of the Cage, where he is the current Light Heavyweight Champion.

Mixed martial arts career

Amateur career
In December 2009, Butcher fought for the North American Allied Fight Series amateur Light Heavyweight Championship against Dane Bonnigson. He lost via referee stoppage due to strikes.

Butcher compiled an amateur record of 4–2 before moving into professional mixed martial arts.

Early professional career
Butcher started his professional career in 2011. He fought exclusively for the Kentucky-based promotion, Spartan Fighting Championship.

Butcher won three times in a row, including first round victories over fellow prospects Jared Combs and Dominique Steele. In 2012, Butcher signed with Bellator.

Bellator Fighting Championships
Butcher made his debut on June 22, 2012 at Bellator 71 against Duane Bastress. He won via submission early in the first round.

Butcher faced Shaun Asher on October 26, 2012 at Bellator 78. He won via submission in the first round.

Butcher faced Jack Hermansson on March 21, 2013 at Bellator 93. For the fifth time in a row he won via submission in the first round.

Butcher faced Giva Santana on September 7, 2013 at Bellator 98 in the quarterfinal match of Bellator Season Nine Middleweight Tournament. After losing the first round, Butcher rebounded and won the fight via TKO in the second round.

Butcher faced Mikkel Parlo in the semifinal on October 4, 2013 at Bellator 102. He lost the fight via unanimous decision (30–27, 29–28, 29–28).

Butcher faced Andreas Michailidis at Bellator 128 on October 10, 2014. He won the fight via TKO in the second round.

Butcher faced Tamdan McCrory at Bellator 134 on February 27, 2015. He lost the fight via submission in the first round.

Mixed martial arts record

|-
| Loss
| align=center|13–5
|Dequan Townsend
|Decision (unanimous)
|B2 Fighting Series 154
|
|align=center|5
|align=center|5:00
|Novi, Michigan, United States
|
|-
|Win
|align=center|13–4
|Karl Williams
|Submission (triangle choke)
|B2 Fighting Series 142
|
|align=center|1
|align=center|1:38
|Lexington, Kentucky, United States
|
|-
|Win
|align=center|12–4
|Gabriel Mota
|Submission (triangle choke)
|HR MMA 121
|
|align=center|1
|align=center|2:38
|Covington, Kentucky, United States
|
|- 
| Loss
| align=center|11–4
|Emiliano Sordi
|KO (punch)
|PFL 7
|
|align=center|1
|align=center|0:16
|Atlantic City, New Jersey, United States 
|
|-
| Loss
| align=center|11–3
| Maxim Grishin
| TKO (leg injury)
| PFL 2
| 
| align=center| 1
| align=center| 1:41
| Chicago, Illinois, United States
| 
|-
|Win
|align=center|11–2
|Jesse Murray
|KO (punches)
|KOTC: Locked In
|
|align=center|1
|align=center|2:42
|Philadelphia, Pennsylvania, United States
|Defended KOTC Light Heavyweight Championship.
|-
|Win
|align=center|10–2
|William Hill
|TKO
|KOTC: Violent Confrontation
|
|align=center|1
|align=center|2:07
|Carlton, Minnesota, United States
|Defended KOTC Light Heavyweight Championship.
|-
|Win
|align=center|9–2
|Robert Morrow
|KO (punches)
|KOTC: Harm's Way
|
|align=center|1
|align=center|1:01
|Washington, Pennsylvania, United States
|Won the KOTC Light Heavyweight Championship.
|-
|Loss
|align=center|8–2
|Tamdan McCrory
|Submission (armbar)
|Bellator 134
|
|align=center|1
|align=center|1:06
|Uncasville, Connecticut, United States
|
|-
|Win
|align=center|8–1
|Andreas Michailidis
|TKO (punches)
|Bellator 128
|
|align=center|2
|align=center|0:28
|Thackerville, Oklahoma, United States
|
|-
|Loss
|align=center|7–1
|Mikkel Parlo
|Decision (unanimous)
|Bellator 102
|
|align=center|3
|align=center|5:00
|Visalia, California, United States
|Bellator Season Nine Middleweight Tournament Semifinal.
|-
|Win
|align=center|7–0
|Giva Santana
|TKO (punches)
|Bellator 98
|
|align=center|2
|align=center|1:12
|Uncasville, Connecticut, United States
|
|-
|Win
|align=center|6–0
|Jack Hermansson
|Submission (triangle choke)
|Bellator 93
|
|align=center|1
|align=center|2:24
|Lewiston, Maine, United States
|
|-
|Win
|align=center|5–0
|Shaun Asher
|Submission (guillotine choke)
|Bellator 78
|
|align=center|1
|align=center|1:32
|Dayton, Ohio, United States
|
|-
|Win
|align=center|4–0
|Duane Bastress
|Submission (triangle choke)
|Bellator 71
|
|align=center|1
|align=center|1:03
|Chester, West Virginia, United States
|Middleweight debut.
|-
|Win
|align=center|3–0
|Jared Combs
|Submission (triangle choke)
|Spartan FC 11: Destruction
|
|align=center|1
|align=center|3:00
|Ashland, Kentucky, United States
|195 lb. Catchweight bout
|-
|Win
|align=center|2–0
|Lamont Stafford
|Submission (armbar)
|Spartan FC 8: Onslaught
|
|align=center|1
|align=center|1:45
|Ashland, Kentucky, United States
|
|-
|Win
|align=center|1–0
|Dominique Steele
|KO (punch)
|Spartan FC 7: Locked and Loaded
|
|align=center|1
|align=center|0:45
|Lexington, Kentucky, United States
|

Mixed martial arts amateur record

|-
|Loss
|align=center|4–2
|Mike King
|Decision (unanimous)
|NAAFS: Caged Vengeance 8
|
|align=center|3
|align=center|3:00
|Columbus, Ohio, United States
|
|-
|Win
|align=center|4–1
|Anthony DiPiero
|Submission (anaconda choke)
|NAAFS: Rock N Rumble 4
|
|align=center|1
|align=center|0:51
|Cleveland, Ohio, United States
|
|-
|Loss
|align=center|3–1
|Dane Bonnigson
|TKO (punches)
|NAAFS: Night of Champions 2009
|
|align=center|1
|align=center|0:14
|Akron, Ohio, United States
|For NAAFS Amateur Light Heavyweight Championship.
|-
|Win
|align=center|3–0
|Dan Spohn
|Submission (rear-naked choke)
|NAAFS: Caged Fury 7
|
|align=center|2
|align=center|1:38
|Cleveland, Ohio, United States
|
|-
|Win
|align=center|2–0
|Phillip Clark Jr.
|TKO (punches)
|NAAFS: Caged Vengeance 6
|
|align=center|1
|align=center|1:26
|Columbus, Ohio, United States
|
|-
|Win
|align=center|1–0
|Vincent Antinore
|Submission (punches)
|UVC 1: Rumble on the River
|
|align=center|1
|align=center|1:23
|Portsmouth, Ohio, United States
|

References

1984 births
Living people
People from Lincoln County, West Virginia
American practitioners of Brazilian jiu-jitsu
People awarded a black belt in Brazilian jiu-jitsu
American male mixed martial artists
Middleweight mixed martial artists
Mixed martial artists utilizing Brazilian jiu-jitsu
People from Huntington, West Virginia
Mixed martial artists from West Virginia